Coile is a surname. Notable people with the surname include:

Albert Van Coile (1900–1927), Belgian footballer
Brantley Coile, American inventor

See also
Coyle